The 2000 World Junior Figure Skating Championships was held from March 5 to 12 in Oberstdorf, Germany. Medals were awarded in men's singles, ladies' singles, pair skating, and ice dancing. Due to the large number of participants, the men's and ladies' qualifying groups were split into groups A and B.

Medals table

Results

Men

Ladies

Pairs

Ice dancing

References
 

World Junior Figure Skating Championships
World Junior Figure Skating Championships, 2000
Figure
World Junior 2000